The Arctowski Peninsula is a peninsula,  long in a north-south direction, lying between Andvord Bay and Wilhelmina Bay on the west coast of Graham Land. It was discovered by the Belgian Antarctic Expedition, 1897–99, under Adrien de Gerlache. The name, for Henryk Arctowski of that expedition, was suggested by the Advisory Committee on Antarctic Names for this previously unnamed feature.

See also
Gerlache Strait Geology

References
 

Peninsulas of Graham Land
Danco Coast
Poland and the Antarctic